Villa Heights Plantation was originally the home of Lt. Colonel Elijah McClanahan in Roanoke, Virginia. Built in 1820, it has been substantially renovated and restored over the years, and has been known as "Long Meadow", "Villa Heights" and "The Compton-Bateman House". The familiar name, "Villa Heights", was also the origin of the neighborhood name of Villa Heights, Roanoke, Virginia. It was added to the National Register of Historic Places in 2018.

Elijah McClanahan
Elijah McClanahan (April 20, 1770 died 1857) built this home in 1820. "Built in 1820, the house was owned by Lt. Col. Elijah McClanahan, a War of 1812 veteran. The original Federal architecture was renovated in the early 20th century with  Classical revival features on the interior and exterior and has been known as the Compton-Bateman house." This property was later to be known as part of the Villa Heights neighborhood in Roanoke, Virginia. Originally named "Long Meadow" by Col. McClanahan, over the years the name of the house was known as "Villa Heights", from which the neighborhood was named, to the Compton-Bateman house, as it is locally known today.

"The original dwelling of Villa Heights, built by Elijah McClanahan in 1820, was a comparatively modest Federal style house, compared to its 20th century evolution. However, it was still quite a substantial house for this area during the second quarter of the nineteenth century and, compared to most of the surrounding farmsteads of the time, would have been an iconic and impressive building. Character-defining features of its original Federal design included unpainted Flemish bond, load-bearing brick construction, a molded brick water table, and a five-bay facade with symmetrical fenestration and stone window sills. Today the façade also features Classical Revival detailing around the entry, notably a round-arched opening with a fanlight transom and
five-light sidelights, but it is undetermined as of yet if these were part of the original design or if they were added in a later alteration."

McClanahan was a substantial landowner of the region, and this was his main plantation house. The house later on passed to the Langhorne family.

Compton family
Originally a simple two-story brick structure, Greek revival elements were added by the Compton family in the early 20th century. The Compton family sold the building to the city of Roanoke in 1958, and it remained a recreational center until it was closed in 1999."The last family that owned it, the Batemans, deeded it to the city in 1958."

Recreation center
"The mansion served as a city recreation center from the late 1950s until 2007 and was damaged by a fire in 2011." The house had also been used as a satellite office for the Roanoke City Police force.

2011 fire
There was a fire in the house in 2011, that caused about $600,000.00 worth of damage. The insurance will only cover $500,000.00, and so the city in is straits of what to do about the property. The fire severely damaged the roof. It burned so completely, there was little left of the roofing frame to attach tarps or other protective fabrics onto the house.

In spite of the fire, the home was added to the Virginia endangered landmarks list in 2013. "The Compton-Bateman House in Roanoke, also known as the Villa Heights Recreation Center. It was badly damaged in a fire and will not survive long without immediate attention. It's one of the few remaining antebellum houses in the city."

References

Bibliography

Houses in Roanoke, Virginia
Plantation houses in Virginia